Yorba Linda is a suburban city in northeastern Orange County, California, United States, approximately  southeast of Downtown Los Angeles. It is part of the Los Angeles metropolitan area, and had a population of 68,336 at the 2020 census.

Yorba Linda is known for its connection to Richard Nixon, the 37th president of the United States. His birthplace is a National Historic Landmark, and his presidential library and museum are also located in the city.

Etymology
The name Yorba Linda is made up of two parts: Yorba, after Don Bernardo Yorba, a Californio ranchero who historically owned the area, and Linda, Spanish for beautiful. The name was created 1908 by the Janss Investment Company.

History

Indigenous 
The area is the home of the Tongva, Luiseño, and Juaneño tribal nations, who were there "as early as 4,000 years ago." The Tongva defined their world as Tovaangar, a nation which "extended from Palos Verdes to San Bernardino, from Saddleback Mountain to the San Fernando Valley" and included the entire territory of present-day Yorba Linda. Spanish colonization between 1769 and 1840 brought "disease, invasive species, and livestock" into the area, which "upended the ecological balance of the region and forced the Tongva to resettle around three missions." The village of Hutuknga was located in the area of Yorba Linda.

Early years 

In 1810, the Spanish crown granted José Antonio Yorba 63,414 acres of land, which "spread across much of modern-day Orange County." In 1834, following Mexico's independence from Spain, Yorba's most successful son, Bernardo Yorba (after whom the city would later be named), was granted the  Rancho Cañón de Santa Ana by Mexican governor José Figueroa. Most of this original land was retained after the Mexican–American War in 1848 by descendants of the Yorba family. A portion of the city's land is still owned and developed by descendants of Samuel Kraemer, who acquired it through his marriage to Angelina Yorba, the great-granddaughter of Bernardo Yorba. The site of the Bernardo Yorba Hacienda, referred to as the Don Bernardo Yorba Ranch House Site, is listed as a California Historical Landmark.

Near that same site sits the second oldest private cemetery in the county, the historic Yorba Cemetery. The land was given to the Roman Catholic Archdiocese of Los Angeles by Bernardo Yorba in 1858 since Orange County was not established out of Los Angeles County as a separate county until 1889. The cemetery closed in 1939 and was subsequently vandalized; however, in the 1960s, the Orange County Board of Supervisors took possession of the property to repair the damage, and tours are now available one day per month.

Agricultural era 

A section of the land was sold in 1907 by the Yorba family to Fullerton businessman Jacob Stern, who used the land for barley fields and sheep grazing. Stern subsequently sold the tract to the Janss Investment Company, which first called the area Yorba Linda, and proceeded to subdivide the land and sell it for agriculture and manufacturing. In 1910, the agricultural aspect of that endeavor materialized, and the first of many lemon and orange groves were planted: at the time, the population was still less than 50. A year later, The Pacific Telephone & Telegraph Company began serving Yorba Linda, and the first school was constructed.

In 1912, several things happened in Yorba Linda: it received its first post office; the Yorba Linda Citrus Association was founded; the Southern California Edison Company began providing electricity; and the first church was constructed. The area that would later become downtown was also connected to Los Angeles by the Pacific Electric Railway in 1912, primarily for citrus transport.

In 1913, Richard Nixon was born in Yorba Linda, the chamber of commerce was set up, a library opened as part of the school, and avocado trees were first planted. A year later, a separate district was established for the library system.

In 1915, the Susanna Bixby Bryant Ranch house was constructed. It is a museum that is open to the public.

In 1917, the first street was paved, Yorba Linda Boulevard. The Yorba Linda Star began publication also. It has since become an online section of the OC Register. A printed version of the Star is available at various city buildings free of charge and is delivered to every household in Yorba Linda each Thursday. Past articles are on microfilm at the Yorba Linda Public Library.

The population exceeded 300 for the first time prior to 1920. In 1929, the citrus association's packing house burned down, as it was made of wood. It reopened the next year. During this period, the eastern two-thirds of Yorba Linda (east of the Yorba Linda Country Club) remained part of cattle and agricultural ranches controlled by pioneer families such as the Yorba, de los Reyes, Kraemer, Travis, Dominguez, Friend, and Bryant ranches.

From 1943 to 1958, "approximately seventy thousand braceros were transported to Orange County," used by employers to service citrus crops. Braceros lived in temporary housing projects referred to as "camps," which were policed by local deputies throughout the county. The townspeople of Yorba Linda "refused to allow the housing of braceros in their city, forcing the nearby town of Placentia to board them within the segregated Mexican colonia."

Population growth 

The small town had grown significantly by the 1960s, with more than 1,000 residents by the 1960 Census. Three annexation attempts were made by adjoining cities: Brea in 1958 and Anaheim and Placentia in 1963. These experiences culminated in incorporation, which occurred in 1967.

The new city implemented a municipal general plan in 1972. By the 1980 Census, the population was nearing 30,000. Within ten years it exceeded 50,000.

In 1990, the Birthplace of Richard Nixon opened as a public library and museum. It would later become a federal presidential library. In 1994, the community center opened.

With over 20,000 housing units in the city as of 2016, many residents now oppose further urban development and have organized to reduce traffic congestion. The Yorba Linda Preservation Foundation seeks to protect historical buildings in the city.

Recent times 
In 2005, CNN ranked Yorba Linda as the 21st best place in the U.S. to live. In 2012, Yorba Linda was ranked 42nd on Money magazine's list of America's best small cities. Similarly, in an article by CNN Money, Yorba Linda was one of the richest U.S. cities and the richest in Orange County as reported by the Census data, showing a median household income of more than $120K: "Among towns of between 65,000 and 250,000 in population, Yorba Linda, California, where six-figure incomes are the rule, had the highest median income at $121,075". Yorba Linda has been identified as one of the richest cities in the U.S. by the U.S. Census Bureau, which shows a median household income of $121,075, higher than any other city in 2006.

In 2007, Yorba Linda High School broke ground after many years of planning.

In November 2008, eastern Yorba Linda suffered from fires that destroyed 113 homes and damaged 50 others. The destruction was due largely to erratic winds causing embers to fly up to half a mile away.

On February 3, 2019, at approximately 1:45 pm, a twin engine 1981 Cessna (N414RS) on route from Fullerton Municipal Airport to Nevada crashed from roughly 7500 ft into a single family residence in the 19700 block of Crestknoll Drive near Glenknoll Elementary School. The pilot (75-year-old Antonio Pastini) and four individuals in the residence were killed.

Geography 

It has two ZIP codes, 92886 and 92887, covering approximately the western and eastern portions of the city, respectively. A third, 92885, exists exclusively for PO Boxes. The city is served by area codes 657 and 714 in a geographical overlay situation, in which 714 numbers were running out, so that 657 numbers are now also being issued in the same area. Eleven-digit dialing is therefore now required for local calls.

It is bordered by Anaheim on the south, Placentia on the west and southwest, Brea on the northwest, Chino Hills State Park on the north, and Corona on the east.

The two nearest seismic faults are the Whittier Fault and the Chino Fault, both of which are part of the Elsinore Fault Zone.

Climate 
Humidity, likewise respectively, is 52%, 60%, and 56% on average. Yorba Linda is situated in a transition zone between a hot-summer Mediterranean climate (Csa) and a hot semi-arid climate (BSh).

Demographics

2000 
As of the 2000 Census, there were 58,918 people, 19,252 households, and 16,094 families residing in the city. The population density was 3,042.3 inhabitants per square mile (1,174.4/km). The racial makeup of the city was 81.5% White, 1.2% African American, 0.4% Native American, 11.1% Asian, 0.1% Pacific Islander, 2.7% from other races, and 3.1% from two or more races. Hispanic or Latino of any race were 10.3% of the population.

There were 19,252 households, out of which 44.8% had children under the age of 18 living with them, 72.3% were married couples living together, 8.3% had a female householder with no husband present, and 16.4% were non-families. 12.4% of all households were made up of individuals, and 4.7% had someone living alone who was 65 years of age or older. The average household size was 3.05 and the average family size was 3.35.

In the city, the population was spread out, with 29.3% under the age of 18, 7.3% from 18 to 24, 28.4% from 25 to 44, 27.3% from 45 to 64, and 7.7% who were 65 years of age or older. The median age was 37 years. For every 100 females, there were 96.6 males. For every 100 females age 18 and over, there were 93.1 males.

According to a 2007 estimate, the median household income in the city was $109,681, and the median income for a family was $122,373. Males had a median income of $66,712 versus $41,820 for females. The per capita income for the city was $36,173. 0% of the population were below the poverty line.

2010 
The 2010 United States Census reported that Yorba Linda had a population of 65,237.

The racial makeup of Yorba Linda was:
 48,246 (75.1%) White (65.7% Non-Hispanic White, 9.4% White Hispanic)
 10,030 (15.6%) Asian
 9,220 (14.4%) Hispanic or Latino of any race
 835 (1.3%) African American
 230 (0.4%) Native American
 85 (0.1%) Pacific Islander
 2,256 (3.5%) from other races
 2,552 (4.0%) from two or more races.

The Census reported that 64,044 people (99.7% of the population) lived in households, 97 (0.2%) lived in non-institutionalized group quarters, and 93 (0.1%) were institutionalized.

There were 21,576 households, out of which 8,535 (39.6%) had children under the age of 18 living in them, 15,102 (70.0%) were opposite-sex married couples living together, 1,844 (8.5%) had a female householder with no husband present, 758 (3.5%) had a male householder with no wife present. There were 554 (2.6%) unmarried opposite-sex partnerships, and 101 (0.5%) same-sex married couples or partnerships. 3,119 households (14.5%) were made up of individuals, and 1,515 (7.0%) had someone living alone who was 65 years of age or older. The average household size was 2.97. There were 17,704 families (82.1% of all households); the average family size was 3.29.

The population was spread out, with 15,792 people (24.6%) under the age of 18, 5,574 people (8.7%) aged 18 to 24, 13,848 people (21.6%) aged 25 to 44, 21,414 people (33.3%) aged 45 to 64, and 7,606 people (11.8%) who were 65 years of age or older. The median age was 41.7 years. For every 100 females, there were 94.8 males. For every 100 females age 18 and over, there were 92.2 males.

The homeowner vacancy rate was 1.2%; the rental vacancy rate was 4.0%. 54,464 people (84.8% of the population) lived in owner-occupied housing units and 9,580 people (14.9%) lived in rental housing units.

During 2009–2013, Yorba Linda had a median household income of $112,259, with 3.1% of the population living below the federal poverty line.

Transportation 
Yorba Linda has several major highways and roads that are important through the city. Imperial Highway (SR 90), Bastanchury Road, Esparanza Road, La Palma Avenue, and Yorba Linda Boulevard are west–east streets. North–south streets include Rose Drive, Fairmont Boulevard, Lakeview Avenue, Gypsum Canyon Road, Kellogg Drive, Van Buren Street, Richfield Road, and Village Center Drive. SR 241 has its northern terminus at the southern tip of the city and SR 91 runs through the eastern tip of the city.

A Metrolink commuter rail station was rejected by its city council in 2004.

Economy 

The primary commercial district in Yorba Linda is Savi Ranch.

Smaller shopping centers in the city include:
 Eastlake Village Shopping Center
 Mercado del Rio
 Packing House Square
 Yorba Linda Station Plaza
 Country Club Village

In 2016, construction began on the Yorba Linda Town Center, a 125,000-square-foot shopping and dining center on the corner of Yorba Linda Boulevard and Imperial Highway, featuring Bristol Farms as an anchor tenant. The shopping center opened in April 2019.

There are over 1,000 businesses in the city, not including an additional 1,500 home-based businesses. The city also owns Black Gold Golf Club. Non-profit charities based in Yorba Linda include International Student Volunteers and STEMpowerment Inc.

Savi Ranch 
Savi Ranch is an acronym of Santa Ana Valley Irrigation, an early water company.
Savi Ranch today contains retailers, auto dealers, restaurants, hotels, and office buildings.

Originally, the city pursued construction of an auto mall on the entire Savi Ranch site. The original plan was rejected by residents in favor of a combination of retail stores, restaurants, hotels, and office buildings. As of 2018, one of the three original car lots has been converted into state-mandated low-income  housing, one specializes in wheelchair accessible vehicles, and the remaining car dealer, specializes in high-end, exotic, and specialty used cars.

As a significant source of sales tax revenue to Yorba Linda and as one of the first anchor tenants (along with Best Buy), The Home Depot became a political talking point in its own right, due to the geography that divides Savi Ranch into two sections, the larger east side falling within Yorba Linda's city limits, and the west side where Home Depot is situated falling within the adjacent City of Anaheim boundaries. At the inception of Savi Ranch, the Home Depot was located in Savi Ranch East. In the early 2000s, however, the Super Kmart location in Savi Ranch West ceased operations and The Home Depot moved into the location it previously occupied, taking the sales tax revenue with it to Anaheim.

Also located in the Yorba Linda side of Savi Ranch is the headquarters of John Force Racing, housing operations & hosting displays of legendary 16-time NHRA Funny Car Champion John Force, his team of drivers, and their cars. An on-site museum is dedicated to Force's career.

Top employers 
According to the city's 2020 Comprehensive Annual Financial Report, the top employers in the city are:

Politics 
Yorba Linda was, at one point in time, California's most conservative large community, as measured by the proportion of conservative to liberal voters. Although Democrats have been making inroads in Orange County as a whole as well as the city itself, Yorba Linda is still one of the most consistently Republican cities in the county and state as a whole. Every GOP candidate for president since the city's incorporation in 1967 has received over 52% of the vote in the city. In 2016, the city gave Donald Trump 59 percent of the vote and a 24-point margin of victory, despite the fact that he became the first Republican presidential nominee to lose Orange County since Alf Landon in 1936. Yorba Linda was one of only five cities in Orange County to support Trump with a majority of its vote both in 2016 and 2020. However, in 2020 the Democratic nominee and eventual winner Joe Biden gained at least 40 percent of Yorba Linda's vote.

As of February 2020, the California Secretary of State reported that Yorba Linda had 43,989 registered voters; of those, 10,413 (23.67%) are registered Democrats, 22,025 (50.07%) are registered Republicans, and 9,604 (21.83%) have stated no political party preference. The city voted for California Proposition 8 by 65.8% and for Proposition 4 by 59.3%, displaying a socially conservative bent. Yorba Linda was one of just three California cities to pass a measure in their city council proclaiming its support for the Arizona immigration law, SB1070.

Government

Municipal government 
The city council consists of five members that are elected by residents to four-year terms, with a three-term limit. The council elects its own mayor at the end of every year, whose duties are largely ceremonial because the city employs a council-manager form of government and the city manager runs day-to-day operations.

, the council consists of:
 Dr. Beth Haney, Council Member
 Gene Hernandez, Council Member
 Tara Campbell, Council Member
 Peggy Huang, Mayor
 Carlos Rodriguez, Mayor Pro Tem

Management of the city and coordination of city services is provided by:
 City Manager, Mark Pulone
 Assistant City Manager, David Christian

Commissions 

Yorba Linda has four commissions, which meet monthly or bimonthly, to advise the city council about their respective projects.

The library commission operates the Yorba Linda Public Library, which has existed in some form since 1913, and is composed of five residents whose duties include selecting new materials for the library to acquire and establishing guidelines and regulations, among other things.

The planning commission is in charge of matters pertaining to land use, zoning, annexation, right-of-ways, and construction of new buildings, among other things; however, its five members are appointed by the council.

The traffic commission seeks to address issues of safety, flow, public complaints, parking, and others. Members serve terms of two years.

The parks and recreation commission is composed of council-appointed members as well and is tasked with a variety of responsibilities for all of the city's facilities and trails.

State and federal representation 

Law enforcement 
Law enforcement is currently contracted out to the Orange County Sheriff's Department (California). OCSD maintains a sub-station at Arroyo Park, where Captain Cory Martino is Chief of Police Services.

From 1971 to 2013, police services were provided by the Brea Police Department. Beginning in 1971, this marked the first time in the state's history that a municipality, as opposed to a county sheriff's department, provided police services to another municipality. Prior to this setup, but after the city's incorporation in 1967, Yorba Linda did contract with the Orange County Sheriff's Department, which was and still is typical for municipalities that are not large enough or simply choose not to maintain an in-house police department.

In 2012, the Yorba Linda City Council met with citizens and police chiefs from the Anaheim and Brea police departments, along with Orange County Sheriff Sandra Hutchens, to vote on a new public safety contract. The meeting lasted 9 hours, finally ending at 3:00am on Wednesday April 25. The verdict, Yorba Linda would end its contract with the Brea Police Department after 42 years of service by the Brea Police Department. The city signed a 5-year contract with the Orange County Sheriff's Department becoming effective May 2013.

Infrastructure 
Fire services are provided by the Orange County Fire Authority.

The Yorba Linda Water District, headquartered in Placentia, serves nearly all residents. Golden State Water, which also has a field office in Placentia, serves the remainder.

The city contracts out waste collection to Yorba Linda Disposal.

Natural gas is provided by Southern California Gas Company, and electricity is provided by Southern California Edison.

Yorba Linda has a history of equestrianism with 30 horse trails totaling over 100 miles. As of August 2013, there are plans to construct public stables.

Education 
Yorba Linda is part of the Placentia-Yorba Linda Unified School District, which enrolled approximately 25,000 students as of the 2015–2016 school year. A small portion of Yorba Linda, however, is directed to the Orange Unified School District.

St. Francis of Assisi School serves as the only Catholic school in the city. Many parents seeking a private school education for their children send their PS-8th graders to Heritage Oak Private School and high schoolers to nearby Lutheran High School of Orange County in the city of Orange, Servite High School (Anaheim, California) (boys), Cornelia Connelly School of the Holy Child (Anaheim, California) (girls) or Rosary High School (Fullerton, California) (girls), Mater Dei High School (co-ed) in Santa Ana, or Santa Margarita Catholic High School (co-ed) in Rancho Santa Margarita.

Yorba Linda High School opened its doors in 2009. The first full graduating class from YLHS was the class of 2012. As of 2015, one private high school, Friends Christian High School, is currently under construction. Historically, a majority of Yorba Linda students also attend Esperanza in Anaheim, and Valencia, or El Dorado in Placentia, the other three high schools in the Placentia-Yorba Linda School District. Students can take an assessment to be placed into the magnet Troy High School in nearby Fullerton which is part of the Fullerton Joint Union High School District. Troy High is one of the best performing high schools in the nation by standardized test scores.

Nearby community colleges within twenty miles from the city hall include Fullerton College, Santiago Canyon College, Irvine Valley College, Cypress College, and Santa Ana College. Nearby four-year public universities include California State University, Fullerton, California State Polytechnic University, Pomona, and University of California, Irvine.

Yorba Linda also has a few Montessori preschools:
 Arborland Montessori Children's Academy
 IvyCrest Montessori Private School
 Pine Tree Preschool
 Yorba Linda Montessori

The Yorba Linda Spotlight Theater Company is a nonprofit theater organization for children and teenagers that provides education and performance opportunities. The theater produces full-scale musical productions as well as offering classes in the performing arts.

Library 
The Yorba Linda Public Library is located at 4852 Lakeview Ave, Yorba Linda, CA 92886. The former library was built in 1960 and then expanded in size in 1970. The library is two floors and features community rooms, study rooms, and a variety of special collections and multimedia services.

This new library, which also includes a Cultural Arts Center opened three blocks from the former library in late 2020.

Library services and collections 
The Yorba Linda Public Library offers services and programs for all ages. For children, this includes family story time, infant story time, toddler story time, preschool story time, Bookbug Club (grades K-3), tween events (grades 4–8), and family events like Lego Mania. For teens and adults, the library offers a variety of book clubs, classes, and special events.

The library has several special collections. The music lending collection offers musical instruments, vinyl records, and record players for check out. The seed lending library is a collaborative seed saving collection. The Healthy U collection offers board games, puzzles, day pack hike kits, sewing machines, and story time kits for check out. The library also has a 3D printer.

Twin towns and sister cities 
  Jorba, Catalonia, Spain
  Huaian, Jiangsu, China

Notable people 

 Tyler Armstrong – mountain climber and youngest person to climb Mount Aconcagua
 Sabrina Bryan – singer, actress (The Cheetah Girls)
 Nathan Choate – college baseball coach
 Michael D. Duvall – former Yorba Linda mayor and California State Assemblyman
 Bobby Edner – singer, actor, dancer (Spy Kids 3D: Game Over)
 Danielle Fishel – actress (Boy Meets World)
 John Force – professional drag racer, owner of John Force Racing, reality TV star of Driving Force and 16 time NHRA Funny Car Champion
 Brittany Force – professional drag racer 2017 NHRA Top Fuel Champion Second In Trio Of Daughters
 Courtney Force – professional drag racer, third of John Force's trio of daughters
 Ashley Force Hood – professional drag racer, John Force's daughter

 Ian Fowles – Musician and current guitarist for the California-based rock band The Aquabats
 Eric Friedman, also known as "Erock" – touring guitarist for Creed, former guitarist for Submersed, disc golfer
 Joe Hawley – player in National Football League, back-up center for the Tampa Bay Buccaneers
 Robert Hight – professional drag racer, NHRA Funny Car Champion
 Matthew Hoppe – Soccer player for Middlesbrough in England Championship and the United States national team
Cole Irvin – Major League Baseball player for the Oakland Athletics
 Mitzi Kapture – soap actress
 Dan Kennedy – Major League Soccer player (Chivas USA)
 Bobby Knoop – Major League Baseball player
 Steven Lenhart – Major League Soccer player (San Jose Earthquakes)
 Alli Mauzey – Broadway actress (Wicked, Hairspray, Cry-Baby)
 David McNab – Senior Vice President of Hockey Operations of the Anaheim Ducks.
 Dylan Moore – Major League Baseball player for the Seattle Mariners
 Marcus Mumford – musician (Mumford and Sons)
 Richard Nixon – 37th President of the United States. Richard Nixon was born in Yorba Linda in 1913 and lived there until 1922. His reconstructed home is listed as a National Historic Landmark and a California Historical Landmark. Adjacent to this home is the Richard Nixon Library and Museum
 Audrina Patridge – reality TV actress (The Hills)
 Chris Pontius – Major League Soccer player (D.C. United)
 Bob "Buck" Rodgers – Major League baseball player and manager (Angels)
 Beneil Dariush - UFC Fighter
 Sergio Santos – Major League Baseball (Toronto Blue Jays)
 Ricky Wells – speedway rider, 2009 US National Champion
 Jessamyn West – second cousin to Richard Nixon on her mother's side of the family, authored 1945 novel The Friendly Persuasion; a city park is named in her honor, Jessamyn West Park on Yorba Linda Boulevard

See also 

 Freeway Complex Fire
 Orange County
 Yorba Linda Water District
 Brea Police Department
 Richard Nixon
 Friends Church (Yorba Linda)

References

External links 

 
 Yorba Linda History – Developed by the Yorba Linda Public Library. Includes historic documents and photographs.

 
Cities in Orange County, California
Populated places on the Santa Ana River
Richard Nixon
Populated places established in 1912
Populated places established in 1967
1912 establishments in California
1967 establishments in California
Incorporated cities and towns in California